The Prince of Wales is a Grade II listed public house at 119 Hampstead Road, Euston, London NW1 3EE.

It was built in the mid-1860s. It was subsequently an American bar/restaurant called Positively 4th Street. It then became a cocktail bar called Shaker and Company. It is now an LGBTQ+ Bar called Zodiac.

References

Grade II listed buildings in the London Borough of Camden
Grade II listed pubs in London
1860s architecture
19th-century architecture in the United Kingdom
Pubs in the London Borough of Camden
Former pubs in London